LearnStream is an e-learning company based in Fredericton, Canada. The company was originally started in 1998 through a leveraged management buyout of the operation from its former parent company, FirstClass Systems Corp based in White Rock, BC. LearnStream Strategies relaunched in 2022, to provide strategic consulting and development services in the online education, corporate training, and eLearning space.

The company was founded by entrepreneurs Ken Reimer and Phil Lambert, who raised the capital and engineered the management buyout from the parent company. Reimer was previously president of FirstClass Systems Product Development Corporation, and had previous entrepreneurial adventures in Western Canada. Lambert was previously vice president of FirstClass Systems Product Development Corporation and brought extensive experience with large multi-national manufacturers and small start-ups to the venture.

Description 

Although the company focused originally on IT training, it expanded the client base to include financial services, pharmaceuticals, international development, and defense.

One of the recognitions for the company was winning the Canadian New Media Company of the Year award in 2000. It also won Cindy awards, the KIRA Award, the K. C. Irving Quality Award, and a number of Multimedia Producer awards.

The company was purchased in 2005 by Vitesse Learning, and operated from its New Brunswick base until the original LearnStream was folded into a merged entity. In 2021 LearnStream was relaunched to serve a growing market for eLearning and online learning.

Influence 

As an eLearning pioneer based in Fredericton, LearnStream was a major player in the development of the eLearning workforce of instructional designers, graphic artists, media developers, programmers and others. Many LearnStream alumni have joined and now bring those skills to other firms in the Fredericton area, including Bluedrop Performance Learning, Innovatia, Skillsoft, PulseLearning, Red Hot Learning, PQA, and Virtual Expert Clinics. The alumni remain in contact through a Facebook group for Former LearnStream Employees.

A Telegraph-Journal editorial referred to LearnStream as one of four companies (LearnStream, Mariner Partners, Q1Labs, and Radian6) who "have demonstrated that New Brunswickers have what it takes to excel in the development and application of new technologies".

References

External links
 www.learnstream.ca
 Atlantic Canada Aerospace
 Profile Canada Business

Companies based in Fredericton
Technology companies of Canada